The third Djerad government (Arabic: حكومة جراد الثالثة) was the forty-eighth government of the People's Democratic Republic of Algeria. It is the third government formed by Abdelaziz Djerad on 21 February 2021 under President Abdelmadjid Tebboune.

Composition

Ministers

Deputy Ministers (Deleguate Ministers)

Secretaries of State

Secretary General

References

External links 

 Official announcement

National governments
2021 in Algeria
Government of Algeria
Cabinets established in 2021
2021 establishments in Algeria